"Rainy Jane" is a song written and originally recorded by Neil Sedaka in 1969, covered two years later by Davy Jones. Sedaka's rendition became a minor hit in the U.S., Canada and Australia.

Davy Jones version
Former Monkees lead singer Davy Jones covered "Rainy Jane" in 1971 on his album Davy Jones. He achieved a medium hit with the song that summer in the U.S. (No. 52 Billboard, No. 32 Cash Box) and a substantially larger hit in Canada (No. 14 Pop, No. 21 Adult Contemporary).

Chart history
Neil Sedaka

Davy Jones cover

References

1969 songs
1969 singles
1971 singles
Neil Sedaka songs
Davy Jones songs
Songs written by Neil Sedaka
Bell Records singles
Songs with lyrics by Howard Greenfield